Tennessee's 6th Senate district is one of 33 districts in the Tennessee Senate. It has been represented by Republican Becky Duncan Massey since a 2011 special election to replace fellow Republican Jamie Woodson.

Geography
District 6 covers the southern and eastern half of Knox County, including parts of Knoxville as well as nearby suburbs such as Mascot.

The district is located entirely within Tennessee's 2nd congressional district, and overlaps with the 13th, 14th, 15th, 16th, 18th, and 19th districts of the Tennessee House of Representatives.

Recent election results
Tennessee Senators are elected to staggered four-year terms, with odd-numbered districts holding elections in midterm years and even-numbered districts holding elections in presidential years.

2020

2016

2012

Federal and statewide results in District 6

References

6
Knox County, Tennessee